Synaxarion or Synexarion (plurals Synaxaria, Synexaria; , from συνάγειν, synagein, "to bring together"; cf. etymology of synaxis and synagogue; Latin: Synaxarium, Synexarium;) is the name given in the Eastern Orthodox, Oriental Orthodox and Eastern Catholic Churches to a compilation of hagiographies corresponding roughly to the martyrology of the Roman Church.

There are two kinds of synaxaria: 
Simple synaxaria: lists of the saints arranged in the order of their anniversaries, e.g. the calendar of Morcelli 
Historical synaxaria: including biographical notices, e.g. the Menologion of Basil II and the synaxarium of Sirmond. The notices given in the historical synaxaria are summaries of those in the great menologies, or collections of lives of saints, for the twelve months of the year. As the lessons in the Byzantine Divine Office are mostly the lives of saints, the Synaxarion became the collection of short lives of saints and martyrs, but also of accounts of events, of famous visions seen by saints and even useful narratives whose memory is kept.

Definitions

The exact meaning of the name has changed at various times. Its first use was for the index to the Biblical and other lessons to be read in church. In this sense it corresponds to the Latin Capitulare and Comes. Then the Synaxarion was filled up with the whole text of the pericopes to be read. As far as the Holy Liturgy was concerned this meant that it was essentially transformed into the "Gospel" and "Apostle" books. Synaxarion remained the title for the index to the other lessons. Without changing its name it was filled up with complete texts of these lessons. The mere index of such lessons is generally called menologion heortastikon, a book now hardly needed or used, since the Typikon supplies the same, as well as other, information.

Certain calendars extant in the Middle Ages were also called Synaxaria. Krumbacher describes those composed by Christopher of Mytilene and Theodore Prodromus (twelfth century).

Examples
The oldest historical synaxaria apparently go back to the tenth century. There are a great number of medieval synaxaria extant in manuscript. They are important for Byzantine heortology and church history. The short lives that form the lessons were composed or collected by various writers. Of these Symeon Metaphrastes is the most important. The accounts are of very varying historical value. Emperor Basil II (976-1025) ordered a revision of the synaxarion, which forms an important element of the present official edition. The synaxarion is not now used as a separate book; it is incorporated in the Menaia. The account of the saint or feast is read in the Orthros after the sixth ode of the Canon. It is printed in its place here, and bears each time the name synaxarion as title. Synaxarion then in modern use means, not the whole collection, but each separate lesson in the Menaia and other books. An example of such a synaxarion (for St. Martin I, 13 April) will be found in Nilles, op. cit., infra, I, xlix.

The publication of the Arabic text of the synaxarion of the Coptic Orthodox Church was started simultaneously by J. Forget in the Corp. script. orient. and by R. Basset in the Patrologia Orientalis, it was written using Coptic language before the adoption of Arabic as an official language of Egypt, and that of the Ethiopian synaxarion was begun by I. Guidi in the Patrologia orientalis. The Armenian synaxarion, called the Synaxarion of Ter Israel, was published at Constantinople in 1834, and again in Patrologia Orientalis. There are also various Georgian synaxaria.

Byzantine usage

During the Eastern Orthodox Divine Services the reading of the synaxarion (in the sense of brief lives of the saints of the day) will take place after the Sixth Ode of the Canon at Matins or at the Divine Liturgy. The synaxaria may be printed in a separate volume or may be included with other liturgical texts such as the Menaion or Horologion.

See also
 Calendar of saints
 Hagiography
 Paterikon
 Synaxarion of Constantinople

Notes

References

Attribution

Further reading 
Stefano Antonio Morcelli, Kalendarium ecclesiae Constantinopolitanae (Rome, 1788) Online on Google Books : vol. 1; vol. 2
Hippolyte Delehaye, "Le Synaxaire de Sirmond," in Analecta Bollandiana, xiv. 396-434, where the terminology is explained; idem, Synaxarium ecclesiae Constantinopolitanae e codice Sirmondiano (Brussels, 1902), forming the volume Propylaeum ad acta sanctorum novembris.

External links 

 Introduction to The Synaxarion: The Lives of the Saints of the Orthodox Church, by Hieromonk Makarios of Simonos Petra, Mount Athos

Eastern Orthodox liturgical days
Christian hagiography
Eastern Christian liturgy
Saints days
Eastern Orthodox liturgical books
Christian terminology